James "Hookey" or "Hooky" Leonard (1906–1959) was a Scottish professional footballer.

Leonard signed with Cowdenbeath in 1923. He quickly became a club favourite with brilliant performances. However, during the 1924–25 season, he was suspended after missing several training sessions.  Leonard was the third leading scorer in the Scottish League during the 1925–26 season, but shocked the team and league when he signed with Indiana Flooring of the American Soccer League in December 1926.  He played fifteen league games, scoring eight goals, through the remainder of 1926–27.  Leonard returned to Cowdenbeath for the 1927–28 season but was back in the U.S., this time with the New York Nationals.  He remained with the Nationals through the 1929–30 season, then returned again to Cowdenbeath.  The team then sold his contract to English club Sunderland for £3,000. He made 35 appearances and scored 19 goals in two spells with the club. In October 1932, Leonard joined Morton, his final Scottish League club.

Leonard may have ended his footballing career in the Irish League playing for Shelbourne in 1933–34, Shamrock Rovers in 1934–35, Dolphin in 1935–36, Fearons A, Brideville in 1938–39 and Shelborne in 1939–40. Note that the birth & death dates given are 7 October 1904 in Paisley and 7 September 1959 which differ from those above.

Leonard's exploits are chronicled in Ron Ferguson's Black Diamonds and the Blue Brazil. He was recently elected into the Cowdenbeath Hall of Fame. After retiring, Leonard settled in the US with his family. In July 2003 his family visited Cowdenbeath to receive a commemorative scroll.

References

Scottish footballers
Cowdenbeath F.C. players
American Soccer League (1921–1933) players
Indiana Flooring players
New York Nationals (ASL) players
Sunderland A.F.C. players
Greenock Morton F.C. players
English Football League players
Saltcoats Victoria F.C. players
1959 deaths
Scottish Football League players
Scottish expatriate sportspeople in the United States
Scottish expatriate footballers
Expatriate soccer players in the United States
Rhyl F.C. players
Colwyn Bay F.C. players
Shelbourne F.C. players
Shamrock Rovers F.C. players
Scottish expatriate sportspeople in Ireland
Expatriate association footballers in Ireland
League of Ireland players
Association football forwards
1906 births